An Eccles cake is a small, round pie, similar to a turnover, filled with currants and made from flaky pastry with butter, sometimes topped with demerara sugar. The word cake has generally since narrowed in meaning to sweet, leavened baked goods.

Name and origin
The Eccles cake is named after the English town of Eccles, which is in the historic county of Lancashire and in the ceremonial county of Greater Manchester. Eccles cakes are a Lancashire food tradition, with similar cakes being found in other parts of the County of Lancashire and are traditionally eaten with Lancashire cheese.

It is not known who invented the recipe, but James Birch is credited with being the first person to sell Eccles cakes commercially; he sold the cakes from his shop, at the corner of Vicarage Road and St Mary's Road, now Church Street, in the town centre, in 1793. John Ayto states that Elizabeth Raffald was possibly the person who invented the Eccles Cake.

Eccles cakes do not have Protected Geographical Status, so may be manufactured anywhere and still labelled as "Eccles" cakes.

Similar pastries

The Chorley cake from Chorley is often seen as the most similar variant of the Eccles cake, however it is flatter, made with shortcrust pastry rather than flaky pastry and has no sugar topping.

The Blackburn cake is named after the town of Blackburn and is made with stewed apples in place of currants.

In East Lancashire a cake known as a "Sad Cake", can be found in the Darwen, Blackburn, Accrington, Burnley, Colne, Nelson, Padiham areas and throughout the Rossendale area. The Sad cake is often up to 12 inches (30 cm) in diameter.

The Banbury cake is an oval cake from Banbury, Oxfordshire, similarly filled with currants.

References

External links
 Recipe for Eccles cakes

British cakes
British pastries
Fruit dishes
Eccles, Greater Manchester
Lancashire cuisine